Évita Muzic (born 26 May 1999) is a French professional racing cyclist, who currently rides for UCI Women's WorldTeam . She won the 2021 French National Road Race Championships.

Major results
2019
 National Under-23 Road Championships
1st  Road race
3rd Time trial
 1st  Young rider classification Emakumeen Euskal Bira
 3rd La Périgord Ladies 
2020
 1st Stage 9 Giro Rosa
2021
 1st  Road race, National Road Championships
 3rd  Road race, UEC European Under-23 Road Championships
 5th GP de Plouay
 5th San Sebastian Klasikoa
2022
 1st Alpes Gresivaudan Classic
 2nd Overall Vuelta a Burgos
1st  Young rider classification
 3rd Mont Ventoux Dénivelé Challenge
 6th Overall Tour de Romandie
 8th Overall Tour de France
 9th Grand Prix de Chambéry

References

External links
 

1999 births
Living people
French female cyclists
People from Lons-le-Saunier
Sportspeople from Jura (department)
20th-century French women
21st-century French women
Cyclists from Bourgogne-Franche-Comté